Guðmundsson is an Icelandic patronym, meaning son of Guðmundur. The name may refer to:

Ágúst Guðmundsson (born 1947), Icelandic film director
Albert Guðmundsson (disambiguation)
Ari Guðmundsson (1927–2003), Icelandic Olympic ski jumper
Arinbjörn Guðmundsson (1932–2014), Icelandic chess master
Birkir Ívar Guðmundsson (contemporary), Icelandic professional handball player
Björgólfur Guðmundsson (born 1941), Icelandic billionaire businessman
Björn Hjörtur Guðmundsson (1911–1998), Icelandic master carpenter and environmental pioneer
Böðvar Guðmundsson (born 1939), Icelandic author, playwright, and poet
Einar Már Guðmundsson (born 1954), Icelandic author and poet
Guðmundur Guðmundsson (chess player) (1918–1974), Icelandic chess player
Guðmundur Guðmundsson (handballer) (born 1960), Icelandic professional handball coach
Guðmundur Guðmundsson (Mormon) (1825–1883), Icelandic Mormon missionary
Guðmundur Ívarsson Guðmundsson (1909–1987), Icelandic politician and minister
Haraldur Freyr Guðmundsson (born 1981), Icelandic professional football player
Herbert Guðmundsson (born 1953), Icelandic pop singer
Jóhann Berg Guðmundsson (born 1990), Icelandic professional football player
Jóhann Birnir Guðmundsson (born 1977), Icelandic professional football player
Jón Guðmundsson (1904–1988) was an Icelandic chess player.
Jón Axel Guðmundsson (born 1996), Icelandic basketball player. 
Jón lærði Guðmundsson (1574–1658) was an Icelandic autodidact, poet, and alleged sorcerer. 
Kristján Guðmundsson (born 1941), contemporary Icelandic conceptual artist
Kristmann Guðmundsson (1901–1983), Icelandic novelist of romantic fiction
Magnús Guðmundsson (1879–1937), Icelandic politician; member of the Althing 1916–1937
Páll Guðmundsson (born 1959), Icelandic sculptor and artist
Pétur Guðmundsson (basketball) (born 1958), Icelandic professional basketball player
Pétur Guðmundsson (athlete) (born 1962), Icelandic shot putter
Tómas Guðmundsson (1901–1983), Icelandic author and poet; known as “Reykjavík’s poet”
Tryggvi Guðmundsson (born 1974), Icelandic professional football player

See also
Guðmundsdóttir

Icelandic-language surnames
Patronymic surnames